Lindsay is a census-designated place (CDP) in Reeves County, Texas, United States. The population was 271 at the 2010 census.

Geography
Lindsay is located at  (31.368075, -103.536789).

According to the United States Census Bureau, the CDP has a total area of 1.0 square mile (2.7 km2), all land.

Demographics
As of the census of 2000, there were 394 people, 115 households, and 100 families residing in the CDP. The population density was 379.4 people per square mile (146.3/km2). There were 126 housing units at an average density of 121.3/sq mi (46.8/km2). The racial makeup of the CDP was 87.82% White, 0.25% African American, 0.76% Native American, 3.30% from other races, and 7.87% from two or more races. Hispanic or Latino of any race were 91.62% of the population.

There were 115 households, out of which 46.1% had children under the age of 18 living with them, 74.8% were married couples living together, 8.7% had a female householder with no husband present, and 13.0% were non-families. 12.2% of all households were made up of individuals, and 6.1% had someone living alone who was 65 years of age or older. The average household size was 3.43 and the average family size was 3.78.

In the CDP, the population was spread out, with 35.3% under the age of 18, 9.9% from 18 to 24, 26.1% from 25 to 44, 17.5% from 45 to 64, and 11.2% who were 65 years of age or older. The median age was 29 years. For every 100 females, there were 92.2 males. For every 100 females age 18 and over, there were 93.2 males.

The median income for a household in the CDP was $12,188, and the median income for a family was $18,897. Males had a median income of $23,906 versus $8,229 for females. The per capita income for the CDP was $5,142. About 41.6% of families and 43.0% of the population were below the poverty line, including 41.2% of those under age 18 and 51.1% of those age 65 or over.

References

Census-designated places in Reeves County, Texas
Census-designated places in Texas